The 1916 Illinois Fighting Illini football team was an American football team that represented the University of Illinois during the 1916 college football season.  In their fourth season under head coach Robert Zuppke, the Illini compiled a 3–3–1 record and finished in fifth place in the Western Conference. Quarterback Bart Macomber was the team captain.

Schedule

Awards and honors
Bart Macomber, quarterback
 First-team selection by Fielding H. Yost for the 1916 College Football All-America Team
 Second-team selection by Walter Eckersall and Paul Purman for the 1916 All-America team

References

Illinois
Illinois Fighting Illini football seasons
Illinois Fighting Illini football